|}

The Limestone Lad Hurdle is a Grade 3 National Hunt hurdle race in Ireland which is open to horses aged five years and over. 
It is run at Naas over a distance of 2 miles (3,219 metres) and during its running there are eight hurdles to be jumped. The race is scheduled to take place each year in January.

The race was first run in 1999, as the Bank of Ireland Hurdle.  It was renamed in 2008 to honour Limestone Lad, who was second in the first running of the race and then won the next three runnings. Prior to 2017 it was run over 2 miles and 3 furlongs.

The race was awarded Grade 3 status in 2011.

Records
Most successful horse (3 wins):
 Limestone Lad – 2000, 2001, 2002

Leading jockey  (5 wins):

 Paul Townend - Mikael D'Haguenet (2012), Sandsend (2018), Stormy Ireland (2020), Bachasson (2021), Echoes In Rain (2023)

Leading trainer (6 wins):
 James Bowe- Limestone Lad (2000, 2001, 2002), Solerina (2004, 2006), Sweet Kiln (2007)
 Willie Mullins -  Mikael D'Haguenet (2012), Sempre Medici (2016), Sandsend (2018), Stormy Ireland (2020), Bachasson (2021), Echoes In Rain (2023)

Winners

See also 
Horse racing in Ireland
List of Irish National Hunt races

References
Racing Post:
,, 

National Hunt hurdle races
National Hunt races in Ireland
Naas Racecourse
Recurring sporting events established in 1999
1999 establishments in Ireland